The New American Poetry 1945–1960 is a poetry anthology edited by Donald Allen and published in 1960. It aimed to pick out the "third generation" of American modernist poets, and included quite a number of poems fresh from the little magazines of the late 1950s. In the longer term it attained a classic status, with critical approval and continuing sales. It was reprinted in 1999. As of 2023, Edward Field and Gary Snyder are the only contributors still living.

Overview
In 1958, Allen began work on The New American Poetry anthology. Following the Pound/Williams tradition, Allen hoped to present the range of experimental writing produced in the United States since the Second World War. The project took two years to complete and required extensive correspondence with poets, editors, and literary agents. The book was finally published in 1960, and, in addition to the poems, included a brief Preface by Allen, position-statements by some of the contributors, biographical notes, and an Index. Other considerations were taken into account in the organization of this anthology, as the following quotation illustrates:

At the time of its publication, it increased the recognition for such poets as Robert Duncan, Robert Creeley, Denise Levertov, Paul Blackburn, and Charles Olson, now recognized figures in what was then an emerging countertradition. Allen originally planned to publish revised anthologies every two or three years. However, he produced only two such books over the next twenty years: New American Writing (Penguin, 1965), and The Postmoderns (Grove, 1965).

The anthology was also influential in Canada. "It affected the writing of at least one generation of Canadian poets", according to The Canadian Encyclopedia. The anthology influenced many Canadian poets to turn away from British influences and toward American models.

See also
Charters, Ann (ed.). The Portable Beat Reader. Penguin Books. New York. 1992.  (hc);  (pbk)

Notes

External links
Great Anthology: The New American Poetry: 1945–1960 article at "The Academy of American Poets" website
Whose New American Poetry? article by Marjorie Perloff
Tribute to Donald M. Allen at Empty Mirror Books website
Ron Silliman discusses Donald Allen’s The New American Poetry from Silliman's Blog: June 11, 2007. Writes Silliman: "unquestionably the most influential single anthology of the last century. It’s a great book, an epoch-making one in many ways."

1960 poetry books
American poetry anthologies
American poetry
20th-century American literature